Busan Exhibition and Convention Center, commonly known as BEXCO, is a convention and exhibition center located in Centum City, Haeundae-gu, Busan, South Korea. It features over 46,500 m2 of exhibition space and 53 meeting rooms. In June 2012, BEXCO completed its expansion to add a 4,002-seat auditorium and a new exhibition center.

BEXCO has hosted a variety of events, notability as a concert venue for Koreans as well as international artists, such as Grammy Award winners Michael Bolton and Dr. Dre.

Events 
 2002 FIFA World Cup Group Draw : December 1，2001
 2002 Asian Games International Broadcast Center and Main Press Center : 16 September to 16 October 2002
 2004 Mariah Carey: Charmbracelet World Tour - February 13, 2004
 2005 APEC Summit : 15 November to 21 November 2005
 2009 OECD World Forum on Statistics, Knowledge and Policy : 27 October to 30 October 2009
 6th Busan International Motor Show : 24 May to 3 June 2012
 Jason Mraz: world Tour concert - 8 June 2012
 2011 the Fourth High-Level Forum on Aid Effectiveness in Busan : 9 November to 1 December 2011
 2012 the 95th Lions Clubs International Convention : 22 June to 26 June 2012
Elton John: 40th Anniversary of the Rocket Man - 29 November 2012
 The 10th Assembly of the World Council of Churches : 30 October to 8 November 2013
 International Aerosol Conference 2014 August, 2014
 2014 League of Legends World Championship Quarterfinals  October 3–6, 2014.
 2014 ITU Plenipotentiary Conference : 20 October to November 7, 2014
 2014 ASEAN-Republic of Korea Commemorative Summit: 20 October to 7 November 2014
 2015 Inter-American Development Bank (IDB) and the Inter-American Investment Corporation (IIC) Annual Meeting of the Boards of Governors : 26 March to 29 March 2015
 2016 Drone Show Korea : 28 January to 29 January 2016
 2018 League of Legends World Championship Group Stage and Quarterfinals Oct 10-17 and Oct 20-21
 2019 Brawl Stars World Championship Nov 15-16
 2022 League of Legends Mid-Season Invitational May 10-29

See also 
 G-Star

References

External links 

 Official websites 
 City of Busan - BEXCO

Convention centers in South Korea
Buildings and structures in Busan
Tourist attractions in Busan
Esports venues in South Korea